Walnut Bend Independent School District is a public school district located in northeastern Cooke County, Texas (USA).

The district has one school that serves students in Pre-Kindergarten (Pre-K) through eighth grade.  High school students take a bus to Callisburg Independent School District.

In 2009, the school district was rated "Recognized" by the Texas Education Agency.

References

External links
Walnut Bend ISD

School districts in Cooke County, Texas